Alberta has provincial legislation allowing its municipalities to conduct municipal censuses between April 1 and June 30 inclusive. Municipalities choose to conduct their own censuses for multiple reasons such as to better inform municipal service planning and provision, to capitalize on per capita based grant funding from higher levels of government, or to simply update their populations since the last federal census.

Alberta began the year of 2017 with 354 municipalities. Of these, 35 conducted a municipal census in 2017. Alberta Municipal Affairs recognized those conducted by 34 of these municipalities. By municipal status, it recognized those conducted by 7 of Alberta's 18 cities, 16 of 107 towns, 10 of 87 villages, 1 of its 51 summer villages, and 1 of 64 municipal districts.

Some municipalities achieved population milestones as a result of their 2017 censuses. Fort Saskatchewan exceeded 25,000 residents, while Chestermere surpassed 20,000 people and Crossfield grew beyond the 3,000 mark for the first time.

Municipal census results 
The following summarizes the results of the numerous municipal censuses conducted in 2017.

See also 
List of communities in Alberta

Notes

References

External links 
Alberta Municipal Affairs: Municipal Census & Population Lists
Statistics Canada: Census Program

Local government in Alberta
Municipal censuses in Alberta
2017 censuses
2017 in Alberta